The George Thorndike Angell Memorial (sometimes called Angell Memorial Fountain or George Thorndike Angell Memorial Horse Fountain) is a monument commemorating George Thorndike Angell in Boston, Massachusetts. The fountain and 7,500 square foot plaza were designed by the firm of Peabody & Stearns in 1912. The work was surveyed by the Smithsonian Institution's "Save Outdoor Sculpture!" program in 1997.

References

External links
 George Thorndike Angell Park and Memorial – Boston, MA

Monuments and memorials in Boston
Outdoor sculptures in Boston
Sculptures of lions